The 1989–90 Football League Cup (known as the Littlewoods Challenge Cup for sponsorship reasons) was the 30th season of the Football League Cup, a knockout competition for England's top 92 football clubs.

The competition began on 21 August 1989, and ended with the final on 29 April 1990 at the Old Wembley Stadium. The cup was won by Nottingham Forest who beat Oldham Athletic in the final, who regained the trophy after winning it the previous season. This was the second time that Nottingham Forest had won the trophy in successive seasons, having won previously in 1978 and 1979.

First round
A total of 56 teams took part in the First Round. All of the Third Division and Fourth Division sides entered, with eight of the Second Division clubs also starting in this round. The eight clubs consisted of the three teams promoted from the Third Division and the five teams finishing 17th to 21st in the Second Division from the 1988–89 season. Each tie was played across two legs.

First Leg

Second Leg

Second round
A total of 64 teams took part in the Second Round, including the 28 winners from round one. The remaining Second Division clubs entered in this round, as well as the 20 sides from the First Division. Each tie was again played across two legs.

First Leg

Second Leg

Third round
A total of 32 teams took part in the Third Round, all 32 winners from round two. Unlike the previous two rounds, this round was played over one leg. Frank Bunn scores a new League Cup record six goals in Oldham's 7–0 victory over Scarborough.'Ties

Replays

2nd Replay

3rd Replay

Fourth round
A total of 16 teams took part in the Fourth Round, all 16 winners from round three. Once again this round was played over one leg.

Ties

Replays

Fifth round
The eight winners from the Fourth Round took part in the Fifth Round. Once again this round was played over one leg.

Ties

Replays

 2nd Replay

Semi-finals
As with the first two rounds, the semi-final ties were played over two legs. Holders Nottingham Forest narrowly defeated Coventry City, while West Ham United bowed out in the semi-finals for the second year running, this time at the hands of Oldham Athletic 6–3 on aggregate. Oldham's 6-0 first leg victory all but sealed their first ever appearance in a major final and at Wembley, was a record for a league cup semi-final until Manchester City defeated Burton Albion 9–0 in the first-leg of the semi-final tie in 2019. Five years earlier, in 2014, City had equaled Oldham's record, again at the expense of West Ham, with a 6-0 first-leg semi-final victory, and on that occasion City's 3–0 win in the second leg at Upton Park had set a record for an aggregate victory (9-0) which City themselves surpassed in 2019 with a 1-0 second-leg win at Burton for a 10-0 aggregate semi-final win. 

First leg

Second legNottingham Forest won 2–1 on aggregate.Oldham Athletic won 6–3 on aggregate.''

Final

References

General

Specific

External links
Official Carling Cup website

EFL Cup seasons
1989–90 domestic association football cups
Lea
Cup